Three Summers is a 2019 Brazilian drama film directed by Sandra Kogut. It was screened in the Contemporary World Cinema section at the 2019 Toronto International Film Festival.

Cast
 Regina Casé
 Rogério Fróes
 Otávio Müller
 Alli Willow

References

External links
 

2019 films
2019 drama films
Brazilian drama films
2010s Portuguese-language films